This is a list of motion picture films. Those films known to be no longer available have been marked "(discontinued)". This article includes color and black-and-white negative films, reversal camera films, intermediate stocks, and print stocks.

3M 
3M no longer manufactures motion picture film.
 CR 160 Camera Reversal Film 16mm B&W (negative or reversal) (discontinued)
 CR 250 Camera Reversal Film 16mm B&W (negative or reversal) (discontinued)
 CR 64 Camera Reversal Film 16mm B&W (negative or reversal) (discontinued)
 Fine Grain Release Positive, Type 150, B&W, 35mm & 16mm (discontinued)
 Reversal Print, Type 160, B&W, 16mm (discontinued)
 Color Print, Type 650, 35mm & 16mm (discontinued)

Note: 1973 is first and last appearance in American Cinematographer Manual (4th edition).

Agfa 
Agfa Wittner-Chrome, Aviphot-Chrome or Agfachrome reversal stocks (rated at 200 ISO, made from Wittner-Chrome 35mm still film) are available in 16mm and 8mm from Wittner-Cinetec in Germany or Spectra Film and Video in the United States. Agfa label was also used as such in widely produced East German film stock based on Agfa patents before the introduction of ORWO in 1964.

XT
 XT100 (35 mm & 16 mm) (discontinued)
 XT125 (35 mm & 16 mm) (discontinued)
 XTR250 (35 mm & 16 mm) (discontinued)
 XT320 (35 mm & 16 mm) (discontinued)
 XTS400 (35 mm & 16 mm) (discontinued)

Black-and-white
 Agfapan 250 250 D/200 T (discontinued)

Note: 1993 is the last appearance of Agfa film stocks in the American Cinematographer Manual (seventh edition).

DuPont 
DuPont no longer manufactures film. It first entered the 35mm motion picture market in 1926.
 Rapid X Reversal Pan (discontinued)

The list below is of film stocks in use in 1956; the "B" designation was for 35mm, "A" was 16mm.
 Superior 1, Type 904B (ASA 23 Day, 20 Incandescent) B&W (discontinued)
 Superior 2, Type 926B (ASA 80 Day, 64 Incandescent) B&W (discontinued)
 Superior 3, Type 927B (ASA 125 Day, 100 Incandescent) B&W (discontinued)
 Duplicating Negative, Type 908B, Fine grain, panchromatic B&W (discontinued)
 Master Positive, Type 828B, Fine grain B&W (discontinued)
 Sound Recording, Type 801B, Variable area or density optical sound tracks (discontinued)
 VA Sound Recording, Type 831B, Variable area optical sound tracks (discontinued)
 Fine Grain Sound Recording, Type 837B, (to increase sharpness) (discontinued)
 Release Positive, Type 803B, High speed, normal grain (discontinued)
 Fine Grain Release Positive, Type 825B, for optimum picture and sound quality (discontinued)
 Title Stock, Type 805B, a high contrast film (discontinued)
 Low Contrast Positive, Type 824B, for kinescope recording (discontinued)

The list below is from 1960; "A" was 16mm, "B" was 35mm.
 Superior 2, Type 936 B and A (ASA 125 Day, 100 Tungsten) B&W (discontinued)
 Superior 4, Type 928 B and A (ASA 320 Day, 250 Tungsten) B&W (discontinued)
 Panchromatic Film, Type 914A (could be used as negative or reversal) B&W (discontinued)
 Rapid Reversal Film, Type 930A (could be used as negative or reversal) B&W (discontinued)
 High Speed Rapid Reversal Film, Type 931A (could be used as negative or reversal) B&W (discontinued)

The list below is from 1966; "A" was 16mm, "B" was 35mm.
 Fine Grain Superior 2 Negative, Type 936 B and A (ASA 125 Day, 100 Tungsten) B&W (discontinued)
 Superior 3 Negative, Type 937 B and A (ASA 250 Day, 200 Tungsten) B&W (discontinued)
 Superior 4 Negative, Type 928 B and A (ASA 320 Day, 250 Tungsten) B&W (discontinued)
 Rapid Reversal, Type 930A, (ASA 64 Day, 50 Tungsten) B&W (discontinued)
 High Speed Reversal, Type 931 B and A (ASA 160 Day, 125 Tungsten) B&W (discontinued)
 Ultra Speed Reversal, Type 932 B and A (ASA 320 Day, 250 Tungsten) B&W (discontinued)
 Fine Grain Duplicating Negative, Type 908 B and A, B&W (discontinued)
 Pan Rapid Reversal Duplicating, Type 910A, B&W (discontinued)
 Fine Grain Release Positive, Type 825 B and A, B&W (discontinued)
 TV Recording Film, Type 834 B and A, B&W (discontinued)

The 1969 list is identical to 1966. 1969 is the last appearance of DuPont motion picture film stocks in the American Cinematographer Manual.

The list below is from 1970; "A" was 16mm, "B" was 35mm. Films marked with ‡ could also be processed as a negative film stock
 Superior 2, Type 936 B and A, B&W Negative (discontinued)
 Superior 3, Type 937 B and A, B&W Negative (discontinued)
 Superior 4, Type 928 B and A, B&W Negative (discontinued)
 Rapid Reversal, Type 930A, B&W Reversal‡ (discontinued)
 High-Speed Rapid Reversal, Type 931 B and A, B&W Reversal‡ (discontinued)
 Ultra Speed Rapid Reversal, Type 932 B and A, B&W Reversal‡ (discontinued)

Filmotec/ORWO 

Filmotec/ORWO is German company in the tradition of Agfa, manufacturing black-and-white materials. The brand ORWO stands for Original Wolfen.
 ORWO U(niversal) N(egative Film) 54, ISO 100
 ORWO N(egative Film) 74, ISO 400
 ORWO P(ositive) F(ilm) 2 and PF 2 plus with an anti-halo undercoat
 ORWO D(uplicating) P(ositive Film) 3
 ORWO D(uplicating) N(egative Film) 2
 ORWO T(on-) F(ilm) 12 d(igital), orthochromatic
 ORWO L(eader) F(ilm) 2, ortho. High Contrast

Fuji 
Fujifilm stopped production of all motion picture film stocks on March 31, 2013.
For negative stocks, "85" prefix designates 35 mm, "86" prefix designates 16 mm stock. Stock numbers ending in a "2" are Fuji's Super-F emulsions (1990s) and the stocks ending in "3" are the new Eterna emulsions.

Also, Eterna Vivid series negatives' last second suffix as "4", and the ending suffix as different "E.I.".

For intermediate stocks, as negatives', adding "45" prefix designates 35 mm in polyester (PET) base, and "87" prefix designates 65/70 mm.

For positive and print stocks, "35" indicates 35 mm print film, and  "36" indicates 16 mm print film.

Fuji also introduced their Reala film, a color stock with a fourth color emulsion layer, which is also the fastest daylight balanced color motion picture stock ever offered at 500 ISO.

As of March 2013, Fuji had ceased production of all motion picture film.

Color negatives (1980s)
 8517 100T introduced in 1977
 8511/8521 (35 mm & 16 mm) Fujicolor A 125T
 8514/8524 (35 mm & 16 mm) Fujicolor AX 500T
 8518/8528 (35 mm & 16 mm) Fujicolor A 250T

Reversal (1980s)
 8427 (16 mm) Fujicolor RT 125T (reversal)
 8428 (16 mm) Fujicolor RT 500T (reversal)

Black-and-white
 71112 (35 mm) Fuji FG 80D/64T
 72161 (16 mm) Fuji RP 80D/64T

F-Series (1988)
 8510/8610 F64T (discontinued)
 8520/8620 F64D (discontinued)
 8530/8630 F125T (discontinued)
 8550/8650 F250T (discontinued)
 8560/8660 F-250D (discontinued)
 8570/8670 F-500T (discontinued)

Super F-Series (1999)
 F-64D 8522/8622
 F-125T 8532/8632
 F-250T 8552/8652
 F-250D 8562/8662
 F-500T 8572/8672
 F-400T 8582/8682

Reala
Containing a fourth color layer, Reala is nominally considered a part of the Super-F series. Its analogue in the stills market is Superia Reala.
 Reala 500D 8592/8692 was introduced in December 2001, and discontinued in February 2011

Eterna (2004–2013)
 Eterna Vivid 160T 8543/8643 introduced in 2007
 Eterna Vivid 250D 8546/8646 introduced in 2010
 Eterna 250D 8563/8663 introduced in 2006
 Eterna 250T 8553/8653 introduced in 2006
 Eterna 400T 8583/8683 introduced in March 2005, discontinued in July 2011
 Eterna 500T 8573/8673 introduced in 2004
 Eterna Vivid 500T 8547/8647 introduced in 2009

Print films
 F-CP 3519 Fujicolor positive film. Polyester (PET) base. Introduced in 1996.
 F-CP 3519D Fujicolor positive film. High-contrast. Polyester base. Introduced in 1999.
 Super F-CP 3510/3610 Fujicolor positive film. Polyester base. Introduced in 2002.
 Eterna-CP 3513DI/3613DI Fujicolor positive film. High-contrast. Polyester base. Introduced in 2002.
 Eterna-CP 3521XD Fujicolor positive film. High-contrast. Polyester base. Introduced in 2007.
 Eterna-CP 3514DI/3614DI Fujicolor positive film. High-contrast. Polyester base. Introduced in April 2010.
 Eterna-CP 3523XD Fujicolor positive film. High-contrast. Polyester base. Introduced in 2010.
 Eterna-CP 3512/3612 Fujicolor positive film. High-contrast. Polyester base. Introduced in 2010.

Intermediate film
 Eterna-CI 8503/4503(Polyester base)/8603 Fujicolor intermediate film.
 Super F-CI 8702(65/70 mm)/8502/4502(Polyester base)/8602 Fujicolor intermediate film. (One of the Super F-Series)

Recording film
 Eterna-RDI 8511/4511(Polyester base) Fujicolor recording film (RDI short for Recording for Digital Intermediate). Designed to be used with Arri Laser.
 Eterna-RDS 4791(Polyester base) Fujicolor recording film (RDS short for Recording for Digital Separation).  The black-and-white recording film designed to be used for digital archive. Process with D96 or D97. Introduced in April 2010.

GAF/Ansco 
GAF/Ansco no longer manufactures film.
 GAF Anscochrome 500 D (discontinued)
 GAF Anscochrome 100 T (discontinued)

The list below is of 35mm film stocks in use in 1956.
 Ansco Color Negative, Type 844. E.I. 16 Day (w/ Wratten #85 filter), 25 Tungsten (discontinued)
 Ansco Color Dupe Negative, Type 846, for Intermediate Negatives (discontinued)
 Ansco Color Print Film, Type 848, for release prints, balanced for approx. 3,000 degrees K (discontinued)
 Ansco Color Reversal Duplicating Film, Type 538, for duplication of positive image originals (discontinued)
 Ansco Supreme, Type 453, panchromatic (black & white?). E.I. 50 Day, 32 Tungsten (discontinued)
 Ansco Ultra-Speed, Type 456, very high speed, medium grain, panchromatic. E.I. 100 Day, 64 Tungsten (discontinued)

Eastman Kodak

Early nitrate films (1916–1941)

Black-and-White (1954–1967)
 Eastman Tri-X panchromatic Negative film 5233 320D/250T introduced in 1954
 Plus-X reversal film 7276 50D/40T introduced in 1955
 Tri-X reversal film 7278 200D/160T introduced in 1955
 Plus-X panchromatic Negative film 5231 80D/64T introduced in 1956
 Plus-X 5231/7231 80D/64T (discontinued in 2010)
 Double-X 5222/7222 250D/200T introduced in 1959
 4-X 5224/7224 500T (discontinued in 1990)
 Plus-X reversal 7276 (16 mm & 8 mm) 50D/40T (discontinued)
 Plus-X reversal 7265 (16 mm & 8 mm) 100D/80T
 Tri-X reversal 7266 (16 mm & 8 mm) 200D/160T
 4-X reversal 7277 200T (discontinued in 1990)
 Tri-X reversal 7278 (16 mm & 8 mm) 200D/160T (discontinued)
 Eastman 4-X negative Pan film 5224/7224 500D/400T introduced in 1964 (discontinued in 1990)
 Kodak 4-X reversal film 7277 400D/320T introduced in 1967
 Kodak Tri-X TV reversal film 7727, TVTX, no longer identified by EKC 
 Eastman Background-X Negative Film 5230, ISO 32 (discontinued)
 Eastman XT Panchromatic Negative Film 5220/7220, ISO 25 (discontinued), introduced in 1966 replacing Background-X

Fine grain color negative films (1950–1968) 
 Eastman Color Negative film 5247 16D introduced in 1950 (discontinued in 1952)
 Eastman Color Negative film 5248 25T introduced in 1952 (discontinued in 1959)
 Eastman Color Negative film 5250 50T introduced in 1959 (discontinued in 1962)
 Eastman Color Negative film 5251 50T introduced in 1962 (discontinued in 1968)
 Eastman Color Negative film 5254/7254 100T introduced in 1968 (discontinued March, 1977)

Eastman Color Negative II (ECN-2 process 1974–1976)
 5247 100T Process ECN-2 introduced in 1974 (discontinued in 1976)
 5247/7247 100T introduced in 1976 (discontinued March, 1983)
 5271/7271 (discontinued in 1980)

Video News Film 16 mm (VNF-1)(1975–1977)
 Eastman Ektachrome Video News Film 7239 (VND) 160D, introduced in 1976. Replaced 7241.
 Eastman Ektachrome Video News Film 7240 125T, introduced in 1975.
 Eastman Ektachrome Video News Film 7240 125T, introduced in 1976 Replaced 7242.
 Eastman Ektachrome High-Speed Video News Film 7250 400T, introduced in 1977.
 Eastman Ektachrome High-Speed Daylight Film 7251 (VXD) 400D.

Kodachrome color reversal film 

 Kodachrome 16 mm introduced in 1935
 Kodachrome 35 mm (135) & 8 mm introduced in 1936 (discontinued in 2009)
 5262 (16 mm) introduced in 1938 (discontinued in 1946)
 5265 (16 mm) introduced in 1940 (discontinued in 1950)
 5267 (35 mm) introduced in 1942
 5268 (16 mm) introduced in 1946 (discontinued in 1958)
 5269 (16 mm) introduced in 1950
 7267 25D (16 mm & 8 mm) (discontinued)
 7270 40T (16 mm & 8 mm) (discontinued)
 64T (discontinued)

Ektachrome color reversal film (E1–E6 and related processes)

 5239/7239 (reversal) 160D
 5240/7240 (16 mm & 8 mm) (reversal) 125T
 5285/7285 100T 
 5285/7285 100D (reversal) introduced in 1999 (discontinued in 2012)
 7250 HS T 400T
 7251 HS Day 400D introduced in 1981
 7252 25T introduced in 1970 (discontinued in 1984)
 7255 introduced in 1958 (discontinued in 1970)
 7280 (8 mm) 64T (discontinued in 2010)
 Ektachrome (Type A) 160T (super 8 mm) introduced in 1971
 Ektachrome SM 7244 (super 8 mm)(reversal) introduced in 1975
 7294 100D (Super-8, 16mm) introduced in 2018, reformulated version of 5285/7285 100D

Eastmancolor Negative (1982–1986)

 5247 125T (discontinued in 1983)
 7291 100T introduced in 1983 (discontinued in 1989)
 7292 320T introduced in 1986 (discontinued in 1992) (First partial "T-Grain" stock)
 5293/7293 250T introduced in 1982 (discontinued 1983)
 5294/7294 400T (35 mm)/320T (16 mm) introduced in 1983 (16 mm discontinued in 1986 35 mm discontinued)
 5295 400T introduced in 1986 (discontinued)
 5297/7297 HS Day 250D introduced in 1986 (discontinued in 1997)

EXR color negative (ECN-2 process 1989–1996)
 5245/7245 EXR 50D introduced in 1989 (discontinued in 2006)
 5248/7248 EXR 100T introduced in 1989 (discontinued in 2005)
 5287/7287 EXR 200T introduced in 1996 (discontinued in 1996)
 5293/7293 EXR 200T introduced in 1992 (discontinued in 2004)
 5296/7296 EXR 500T introduced in 1989 (discontinued in 1995)
 5298/7298 EXR 500T introduced in 1994 (discontinued in 2003)

Vision color negative (ECN-2 process 1996–2002)
 5246/7246 Vision 250D introduced in 1997 (discontinued in 2005)
 5263/7263 Vision 500T introduced in 2002 (discontinued in 2003)
 5274/7274 Vision 200T introduced in 1997 (discontinued in 2006)
 5277/7277 Vision 320T introduced in 1996 (discontinued in 2005)
 5279/7279 Vision 500T introduced in 1996 (discontinued in 2006)
 5284/7284 Vision 500T "Expression" introduced in 2001 (discontinued in 2003)
 5289 Vision 800T introduced in 1998 (discontinued in 2004)
 7289 Vision 800T (16 mm) introduced in 1999 (discontinued in 2004)

Vision2 color negative (ECN-2 process 2002–2007)

 5201/7201 Vision2 50D introduced in 2005. discontinued in 2012.
 5205/7205 Vision2 250D introduced in 2004. discontinued in 2009.
 5212/7212 Vision2 100T introduced in 2004. discontinued in 2010.
 5217/7217 (35, 16, & 8 mm) Vision2 200T introduced in 2004. discontinued in 2010.
 5218/7218 (35, 16, & 8 mm) Vision2 500T introduced in 2002. discontinued in 2009.
 5229/7229 Vision2 "Expression" 500T introduced in 2003. discontinued in 2011.
 5260 Vision2 500T introduced in 2009 (35 mm only). discontinued in 2011.
 5299/7299 Vision2 "HD Color Scan film" 500T introduced in 2005. discontinued in 2009.

Vision3 color negative (ECN-2 process 2007–present)
 5219/7219 Vision3 500T introduced in 2007. SO-219 is ESTAR-base variant.
 5207/7207 Vision3 250D introduced in 2009.
 5213/7213 (35, 16, & 8 mm) Vision3 200T introduced in 2010.
 5203/7203 Vision3 50D introduced in 2011.

Print films (1941–present)

Lab films

Other
 5600 Primetime EXR 640T Teleproduction Film introduced in 1995 (discontinued)
 5620/7620 Primetime 640T introduced in 1997 (discontinued)
 SFX 200T Color Negative Film (35 mm only) introduced in 1998. Special-order film intended for special effects. (discontinued in 2004)
 5230/7230 500T Color Negative Film introduced in 2011 (discontinued in 2012)
 Ektagraphic High Contrast Slide (HCS) orthochromatic negative film for making reverse-text title slides etc.
 Fine Grain Release Positive, blue-sensitive negative film specially for motion film duplication
 Rapid Process Copy (RPC) ultra-slow duplicating film with a blue-tinted base

Ilford
Ilford specialises in B&W films and, until 2003, produced motion picture versions of their photographic films for 16mm and 35mm cameras.
 FP4plus
 HP5plus

(As used in Hollywood, 1960s)
 Ilford Pan F Negative, ASA 25 Day, 20 Tungsten (B&W, 35mm & 16mm)
 Ilford FP3 Negative, ASA 80 Day, 64 Tungsten (B&W, 35mm & 16mm)
 Ilford HP3 Negative, ASA 200 Day, 160 Tungsten (B&W, 35mm & 16mm
 Ilford Mark V Negative, ASA 250 Day, 200 Tungsten (B&W, 35mm & 16mm)
 Ilford HPS Negative, ASA 400 Day, 320 Tungsten (B&W, 35mm & 16mm)
 Ilford HRT Television Recording Film (B&W, 16mm)
 Ilford Fine Grain Safety Positive for release prints (B&W, 35mm & 16mm)
 Ilford Newsreel Positive (B&W, 35mm)
 Ilford SFX 200 Negative for Special Effects, ASA 200 Day, 100 Tungsten (B&W, 16mm)

Note: 1973 is last appearance in American Cinematographer Manual (fourth edition).

Slavich 

A Russian manufacturer.
 Black-and-white negative film NK-2 ISO/GOST 32D/25T
 Black-and-white negative NK-2Sh ISO/GOST 100D/80T
 Black-and-white positive print film МZ-3 ISO/GOST ~5T

Svema 

A defunct Soviet/Ukrainian film manufacturer.
 OCh 50 Black-and-white reversal, Asa 50 D, 40 T discontinued
 OCh 200 Black-and-white reversal, Asa 200 D, 160 T discontinued
OCH 50 and OCH 200: Products of TASMA company

Tasma 

A Russian company, located in the Russian Republic of Tatarstan
 NK-1 – ISO/GOST 250D/200T
 NK-2 – ISO/GOST 100D/80T
 NK-3 – ISO/GOST 32D/25T

See also

 List of photographic films
 List of discontinued photographic films
 135 film
 16 mm film
 35 mm film
 Color motion picture film
 Film base
 Film stock
 List of film formats

References
´
www.pixpast.com for samples of original 35mm agfacolor film from 1936 to 1945.
 Brown, Blaine (1994). The Filmmaker's Pocket Reference Focal Press. pp. 160–161. .
 Detmers, Fred H. (ed.) (1986). American Cinematographer Manual (6th ed.) ASC Press pp. 67. .
 Dr. Ryan, Rod (ed.) (1993). American Cinematographer Manual (7th ed.) ASC Press pp. 127. .
 Hummel, Rob (ed.) (2001). American Cinematographer Manual (8th ed.) ASC Press pp. 860–861. .
 Herrmann, Karl (January 1990). "Film Stock Tests: Eastman (third in a series)" American Cinematographer Magazine ASC Press. pp. 83–88.
 Kodak Cinematographer's Field Guide Kodak publication H-2 (September 1998). pp. MPF-4 – MPF-5.
 Kodak Cinematographer's Field Guide Kodak publication H-2 (January 2006) (12th ed.). pp. MPF-4 – MPF-5.
 https://web.archive.org/web/20070703225400/http://www.filmotec.de/English_Site/Products/products.html

Film and video technology